The Primetime Emmy Award for Outstanding Reality Competition Program is handed out for reality-style, skill-based competition formats during the primetime telecast since 2003. The award goes to the producers of the program.

The Amazing Race won consecutively every year since the category's inception until Top Chef ended its streak in 2010. Likewise, American Idol had been nominated every year since the category's inception, until that streak ended in 2012.

In the following list, the first titles listed are winners, these are also in bold and in blue background; those not in bold are nominees, which are listed in alphabetical order. The years given are those in which the ceremonies took place:

Winners and nominations

2000s

2010s

2020s

Programs with multiple wins

10 wins
 The Amazing Race

4 wins
 RuPaul's Drag Race
 The Voice

Programs with multiple nominations
Totals have been combined with Outstanding Special Class Program, where competition programs were previously eligible.

19 nominations
 The Amazing Race

16 nominations
 Top Chef

14 nominations
 Project Runway

11 nominations
 Dancing with the Stars
 The Voice

9 nominations
 American Idol

6 nominations
 RuPaul's Drag Race
 Survivor

5 nominations
 So You Think You Can Dance

4 nominations
 American Ninja Warrior
 Nailed It!

2 nominations
 The Apprentice

Total awards by network

 CBS – 10
 NBC – 4
 VH1 – 4
 Bravo – 1
 Prime Video – 1

References

See also
Critics' Choice Television Award for Best Reality Series – Competition

Reality Competition Program